Alternative in Action High School (formally known as the Bay Area School of Enterprise) is a charter high school founded in 2001 in Alameda, California. It is the first youth-created charter high school in the United States. It was created by 10 youth and 2 adults working in the afterschool program HOME Project to create a school for non traditional students. BASE is a public charter school in the Alameda Unified School District.

Entirely project-based, students participate in regular projects called "enterprises," including a major "enterprise" in humanities each year.

About the school
The school serves students from Alameda, Oakland and many other cities in the bay area. There were 93 students enrolled in the 2006–2007 school year. The school model is meant for a very small school, and BASE has an enrollment cap of 120 students.

The building is Located by the Alameda College. In 2008 the school had to move to a bigger building Located in a different location than on the formal Naval Base. As the school grew from 47 students in 2001 to 97 students in 2004, it was necessary to expand the school. To this end, students petitioned the Alameda Unified District Board for two portables, which they received. The school was relatively isolated from shops and houses. In 2014, the school moved location from Alameda to Oakland.

The school was renamed Alternative in Action High School in 2014.

References

External links
 

Buildings and structures in Alameda, California
Charter high schools in California
Schools in Alameda County, California
Educational institutions established in 2001
2001 establishments in California